The Australasian Performing Right Association Awards of 2010 (generally known as APRA Music Awards) was the 28th annual ceremony by the Australasian Performing Right Association (APRA) to award outstanding achievements in contemporary songwriting, composing and publishing. They are a series of awards which include the APRA Music Awards and Screen Music Awards. The APRA Music Awards ceremony was held on 21 June at the Sydney Convention Centre, they were presented by APRA and the Australasian Mechanical Copyright Owners Society (AMCOS) and included the new category, 'Rock Work of the Year'. A total of 12 awards were presented. The Screen Music Awards were issued on 9 November by APRA and Australian Guild of Screen Composers (AGSC). The 2010 Classical Music Awards were suspended and were replaced by the Art Music Awards from 2011 held in May that year. They included jazz categories. Art Music Awards are sponsored by APRA and the Australian Music Centre (AMC).

Awards
Nominees and winners with results indicated on the right.

See also
Music of Australia

References

External links
APRA official website
APRA Awards – History

2010 in Australian music
2010 music awards
APRA Awards